The 1953 GP Ouest-France was the 17th edition of the GP Ouest-France cycle race and was held on 31 August 1953. The race started and finished in Plouay. The race was won by Serge Blusson.

General classification

References

1953
1953 in road cycling
1953 in French sport